Staple Design is a visual communications agency based in New York City, founded in 1997 by Jeff Staple (born Jeff Ng). It has three main divisions: a clothing collection, a creative agency, and a retail store. Staple Pigeon is a full lifestyle menswear collection designed by this firm that is distributed globally. Staple Design Studio is a creative consulting firm that has worked with many brands including Nike, Microsoft, Sony, Lotus, Timberland, New Balance, LVMH, and others. Staple Design also owns and operates a retail store called Reed Space in the Lower East Side of New York City, which features an art gallery.

History

Jeff worked as an intern with the pioneer streetwear clothing company PNB Nation and worked as a graphic designer at c.i.t.e. design. He established his brand, Staple, in 1997 while silk-screening T-shirts in his spare time. Later that year, Jeff started Staple Design. Staple Design opened the retail store and art gallery Reed Space in downtown Manhattan in 2002.

In 2005, Staple Pigeon released the NYC Pigeon Dunks sneakers in collaboration with Nike. Only around 200 pairs were ever released, exclusively in New York City. Riots erupted at many of the stores where the shoes were sold, and the shoes currently sell for over US $28,000. Staple Pigeon has since manufactured and sold original works/products online.

Products

Staple Design produces a globally-distributed lifestyle menswear collection. The collection is split into two main lines: Staple, which is mostly graphic and print-focused with tees and tops, and STPL, a cut & sew collection.

References

External links
 Commercial for Staple Design
 Jeff Staple on PSFK TV: 'The Accident'
 Design, Streetwear, and Big Ideas: A Video Interview with Jeff Staple

Clothing brands of the United States
Shoe designers
American fashion designers